Yace may be,

Yace language (Yache)
Philippe Yacé